Oarces is a spider genus in the family Araneidae. It is the sister genus of Gnolus. Gnolus and Oarces transferred from Mimitidae by Dimitrov et al., 2012: Suppl. 1, p. 15.

Species
 Oarces ornatus Mello-Leitão, 1935 (Brazil)
 Oarces reticulatus (Nicolet, 1849)  (Chile, Argentina)

References

 Platnick, N.I. & Shabad, M.U. (1993). A review of the pirate spiders (Aranae, Mimetidae) of Chile. American Museum Novitates 3074. Abstract - PDF (12Mb)

Araneidae
Spiders of South America
Araneomorphae genera